The Philippine Drug Enforcement Agency (PDEA, ; Filipino: Ahensiya ng Pilipinas sa Pagpapatupad ng Batas Laban sa Bawal na Gamot) is the lead anti-drug law enforcement agency, responsible for preventing, investigating and combating any dangerous drugs, controlled precursors and essential chemicals within the Philippines. The agency is tasked with the enforcement of the penal and regulatory provisions of Republic Act No. 9165 (R.A. 9165), otherwise known as the Comprehensive Dangerous Drugs Act of 2002.

PDEA is the implementing arm of the Dangerous Drugs Board (DDB). The DDB is the policy-making and strategy-formulating body in the planning and formulation of policies and programs on drug prevention and control. PDEA and DDB are both under the supervision of the Office of the President of the Philippines.

History and mandate
For thirty years, the Republic Act No. 6425, or the Dangerous Drugs Act of 1972, had been the backbone of the drug law enforcement system in the Philippines. Despite the efforts of various law enforcement agencies mandated to implement the law, the drug problem alarmingly escalated with orbiting Police Officers collecting drug money. The high profitability of the illegal drug trade, compounded by the then existing laws that imposed relatively light penalties to offenders, greatly contributed to the gravity of the problem.

Republic Act No. 9165
Recognizing the need to further strengthen existing laws governing Philippine drug law enforcement system, the then Philippine President Gloria Macapagal Arroyo signed the Republic Act No. 9165, or the Comprehensive Dangerous Drugs Act of 2002, on June 7, 2002, and it took effect on July 4, 2002. The R.A. 9165 defines more concrete courses of action for the national anti-drug campaign and imposes heavier penalties to offenders.

The enactment of R.A. 9165 reorganized the Philippine drug law enforcement system. While the Dangerous Drugs Board remains as the policy-making and strategy-formulating body in planning and formulation of policies and program on drug control and prevention, it created the Philippine Drug Enforcement Agency under the Office of the President.

Creation of task forces
The R.A. 9165 abolished the National Drug Law Enforcement and Prevention Coordinating Center, which was created under Executive Order No. 61, and the Narcotics Group of Philippine National Police (PNP-NG), Narcotics Division of National Bureau of Investigation (NBI-ND), and the Customs Narcotics Interdiction Unit of the Bureau of Customs (BOC-CNIU).

Under Executive Order No.206 dated May 15, 2003, these law enforcement agencies have organized the following anti-illegal drugs task force to support the PDEA: 
Philippine National Police – Anti-Illegal Drugs Special Operation Task Force (PNP-AIDSOTF); 
National Bureau of Investigation – Anti-Illegal Drugs Task Force (NBI-AIDTF);
Bureau of Customs – Customs Task Group/Force in Dangerous Drugs and Controlled Chemicals (BOC-CTGFDDCC).

Organization

National Office 
PDEA is headed by a Director General (DG) with the Cabinet rank of Undersecretary, who is responsible for the general administration and management of the agency. The Director General is assisted by two Deputies Director General with the rank of Assistant Secretary: one for Administration (DDGA) and the other one for Operations (DDGO).

The office of the Director General is also supported by the Secretary for Directorial Staff, Chief of Public Information Office (PIO), Chief of Information Technology Systems Management Office (ITSMO) and Chief of Chemical Audit and Management Unit (CAMU).

The Director General of the PDEA shall be responsible for the necessary changes in the organizational set-up which shall be submitted to the DDB for approval.

Command Group 
 Office of the Director-General
 Chief of Staff
 Office of the Deputy Director-General for Administration
 Office of the Deputy Director-General for Operations

Administrative Cluster 
 Human Resource Management Service (HRMS)
 Financial Management Service (FMS)
 Logistics and Administrative Management Service (LAMS)
 Internal Affairs Service (IAS)
 PDEA Academy

Operational Cluster 
 Intelligence and Investigation Service (IIS)
 Plans and Operations Service (POS)
 Legal and Prosecution Service (LPS)
 Compliance Service (CS)
 International Cooperation and Foreign Affairs Service (ICFAS)
 Preventive Education and Community Involvement Service (PECIS)
 Special Enforcement Service (SES)
 Laboratory Service (LS)
 Public Information Office (PIO)

Regional Offices 
The PDEA have established 17 Regional Offices headed by Directors in the different regions of the country which is responsible for the implementation of RA 9165 and the policies, programs, and projects of the agency in different regions.

 Regional Office I – Camp Diego Silang, Carlatan, San Fernando City, La Union
 Regional Office II – Camp Adduru, Tuguegarao City, Cagayan
 Regional Office III – Diosdado Macapagal Government Center, Brgy. Maimpis, City of San Fernando, Pampanga
 Regional Office IVA – Camp Vicente Lim, Calamba, Laguna
 Regional Office MIMAROPA – Brgy. Sta. Isabel Calapan, Oriental Mindoro
 Regional Office V – Camp General Simeon Ola, Legazpi City, Albay
 Regional Office VI – Camp Martin Delgado, Iloilo City
 Regional Office VII – Doña Modesta Gaisano St., Lahug, Cebu City
 Regional Office VIII – Near Payapay Bridge, Candahug, Palo, Leyte
 Regional Office IX – Upper Calarlan, Zamboanga City
 Regional Office X – Gordiel Bldg., Corrales Avenue, Cagayan de Oro
 Regional Office XI – Camp Captain Domingo E. Leonor, Davao City
 Regional Office XII – Camp Fermin G. Lira Jr., General Santos
 Regional Office XIII – Camp R. Rodriguez, Libertad, Butuan
 Regional Office – Bangsamoro Autonomous Region in Muslim Mindanao (RO-BARMM) – PC Hills, Cotabato City
 Regional Office – Cordillera Administrative Region (RO-CAR) – Camp Bado Dangwa, La Trinidad, Benguet
 Regional Office – National Capital Region (RO-NCR) – PDEA Annex Bldg., National Government Center, Diliman, Quezon City

PDEA Academy 
PDEA maintains its own PDEA Academy temporarily located at Camp General Mariano N. Castañeda in Silang, Cavite. The PDEA Academy is headed by a superintendent, with the rank of director. It is responsible in the recruitment and training of all PDEA agents and personnel. The PDEA Academy formulates programs of instructions on basic and specialized anti-drug training courses as well as career courses for all PDEA Agents and Personnel.

The DDB provide for the qualifications and requirements of its recruits who must be at least 21 years old, of proven integrity and honesty, a Baccalaureate degree holder and with Career Service Professional Eligibility from Civil Service Commission (CSC) or Board License from Professional Regulation Commission (PRC).

Directors general
The Director General of the PDEA shall be appointed by the President of the Philippines with the rank of Undersecretary and shall perform such other duties that may be assigned to him/her. He/she must possess adequate knowledge, training and experience in the field of dangerous drugs, and in any of the following fields: law enforcement, law, medicine, criminology, psychology or social work.

This table lists all PDEA Directors General, their dates of service, and under which administration they served.

Firearms
PDEA Agents are issued with M1911 Pistol or its latest firearm the IWI Jericho 941 Pistol in .45 caliber ammunition upon successful completion of their training at the PDEA Academy while the senior officers are issued with Glock pistols. The PDEA Agents use Armalite M15A2 CTAR Tavor and Galil as their assault rifle in urban warfare and special operations.

To maximize the capability of the anti-drug operatives in the country, PDEA acquired CTAR 21 Tavor which fires the standard NATO caliber 5.56 mm ammunition.

Foreign cooperation
The United States assists Philippine counternarcotics efforts with training, intelligence gathering, and infrastructure development. In 2005, Drug Enforcement Administration (DEA) and the Joint Interagency Task Force West (JIATF-W) began to develop a network of drug information fusion centers in the Philippines. The primary facility, the Interagency Counternarcotics Operations Network (ICON) is located at PDEA National Headquarters in Quezon City. The ICON is a coordinating body that serves as a center for information and intelligence relating to anti-illegal drugs operations. Its mission is to support law enforcement through timely analysis and dissemination of intelligence on the movement of illicit drugs, and coordinate detection, monitoring and interdiction operations. The facilities of ICON are manned jointly by the PDEA as the lead agency, National Intelligence Coordinating Agency (NICA), Armed Forces of the Philippines (AFP), Philippine National Police (PNP), and the Philippine Coast Guard (PCG).

There are three ICON outstations located at the headquarters of the Naval Forces Western Mindanao, Zamboanga del Sur (southwestern Mindanao); Coast Guard Station, General Santos (south-central Mindanao); and at Poro Point, San Fernando, La Union (northwestern Luzon). The ICON facility at PDEA Headquarters is used to produce intelligence products and conduct intelligence training for PDEA Agents. The outstations are also currently used as training sites. As PDEA development leads to manpower increases and improved coordination with other law enforcement agencies, the concept of interagency drug intelligence coordination may be realized.

See also
2021 PNP–PDEA shootout
Comprehensive Dangerous Drugs Act of 2002

References

External links

RA 9165: Comprehensive Dangerous Drugs Act of 2002

Law enforcement in the Philippines
Philippine intelligence agencies
Government agencies under the Office of the President of the Philippines
Drug control law enforcement agencies
Government agencies established in 2002
Drug policy of the Philippines